Bhānumati or Bhanumathi is an Indian name. It may refer to:

 Bhanumati (Mahabharata), wife of Duryodhana, the antagonist of the Indian epic Mahabharata
 P. Bhanumathi (1925-2005), Indian actress, director, and writer
 Bhanumati, Nepal, a village development committee in central Nepal
 Bhanumati (Raga), a Carnatic music scale, the fourth in the original Melakarta scheme
 Bhanumati (novel), the first Assamese novel, written by Padmanath Gohain Baruah in 1890
 Bhanumati Devi

Films 
 Bhanumati Gari Mogudu
 Bhanumathi & Ramakrishna